Newrite is a system of shorthand invented by the American scientist Walter P. Kistler. Propagated now in India by Newrite Foundation India.  
This was initially introduced by The Stenographers' Guild, Newrite has the prospective of becoming computer interfaced stenography in English.

Shorthand systems